EMG may refer to:

Medicine and science 
 Electromyography, a technique for evaluating and recording electrical activity produced by skeletal muscles
 Exponentially modified Gaussian distribution, in probability theory 
 Ɱ, or emg, a symbol used to transcribe a specific sound in the International Phonetic Alphabet

Organisations 
 East Mediterranean Gas Company, an Egyptian pipeline company
 EMG, Inc., an American guitar pickup manufacturer
 E.M.G. Hand-Made Gramophones, a British gramophone manufacturer
 Escape Media Group, Inc., owner of Grooveshark
 Essential Media Group, former name of EQ Media Group
 Euclid Media Group, an American media company
 Executive Music Group, an American record label

Other 
 Eastern Mewahang language
 European Masters Games